Zarechny is a rural locality (a settlement) in Lipinoborskoye Rural Settlement, Vashkinsky District, Vologda Oblast, Russia. The population was 478 as of 2002. There are 5 streets.

Geography 
Zarechny is located 2 km northeast of Lipin Bor (the district's administrative centre) by road. Lipin Bor is the nearest rural locality.

References 

Rural localities in Vashkinsky District